Daniel Leach (born 5 January 1986) is an Australian former footballer who last played for Football League Two club Barnet as a defender.

Career
He attended St. Joseph's Nudgee College in Virginia, Queensland, and played state football for Queensland. He moved on to the Queensland Academy of Sport Football Program, and also played for Brisbane Strikers. During this time he was also called up to the Australia under-17 pool after u16 national championships. He took a break from football, moving to London, England and working in various jobs for 18 months, including an Italian restaurant and a TV commercial amongst other things. He moved to the US and joined Oregon State University (captain four years and all-American), graduating with a psychology major and minor in communications. He also played amateur football for Portland Timbers U23.

In July 2009, he played in Barnet's friendly against Arsenal, and signed for the Bees on a one-year deal a few days later. In February 2010, he joined Conference South side Dover Athletic on a one-month loan deal. Leach was released by Barnet at the end of the 2009–10 season, but remained on trial at the club under new manager Mark Stimson and signed a new contract in July 2010. He scored his first goal for Barnet against Crewe Alexandra in a 2–1 victory.
In January 2012, he took advice from his medical team and decided to retire due to an injury sustained on his foot.

References

External links

1986 births
Living people
Association football defenders
Australian soccer players
Oregon State Beavers men's soccer players
Portland Timbers U23s players
Barnet F.C. players
Dover Athletic F.C. players
Expatriate soccer players in the United States
Expatriate footballers in England
USL League Two players
English Football League players
National League (English football) players
Brisbane Strikers FC players